Brentwood is a suburb of Perth, Western Australia, located within the City of Melville and approximately  from Perth city centre. The nearest airport is Perth Airport ( away) and the nearest railway station is Bull Creek ( away).

History 
Brentwood was developed as a state housing suburb after World War 2. It is named after Brentwood, an English town near London which was the birthplace of John Bateman, a pioneer settler in the area.

References

External links

Suburbs of Perth, Western Australia
Suburbs in the City of Melville